Pietro Magni (October 21, 1817 - January 20, 1877) was an Italian sculptor.  Born in Milan, he studied at that city's Accademia di Belle Arti di Brera before moving to the workshop of Abbondio Sangiorgio.  Later in his career he became influenced by Tuscan sculptor Lorenzo Bartolini, whose work he first encountered in 1837.  He traveled to study in Rome, joining Giuseppe Garibaldi in 1849.  He is best known for his Girl Reading, first carved in 1856; today the original may be seen in Galleria d'Arte Moderna, Milan, while copies exist in numerous other museum collections, e.g. in Palácio Nacional da Ajuda, Lisbon.  Among Magni's other works are a public monument to Leonardo da Vinci on Piazza della Scala and several marble sculpture groups; he also executed statues for the Milan Cathedral in the 1860s.

Magni died in Milan in 1877.

See also 

 La lettrice
 Giovanni Battista Niccolini

References

Pietro Magni at Answers.com
 http://www.palacioajuda.pt/pt-PT/coleccoes/escultura/ContentDetail.aspx?id=216
Julius Bryant, 'Bergonzoli's Amor degli angeli: the Victorian taste for contemporary Latin Sculpture', Apollo, CLVI (2002): 16–21.

1817 births
1877 deaths
Brera Academy alumni
19th-century Italian sculptors
Italian male sculptors
Artists from Milan
Academic staff of Brera Academy
19th-century Italian male artists